On 7 July 1945, the Kalagon massacre was committed against inhabitants of Kalagon, Burma (present-day Myanmar), by members of the 3rd Battalion, 215th Regiment and the OC Moulmein Kempeitai of the Imperial Japanese Army. These units had been ordered by Major General Seiei Yamamoto, chief of staff of the 33rd Army, to sweep the area for guerrillas reportedly teamed with British paratroops.

The Japanese occupied the village and rounded up all the inhabitants, some to the local mosque and others to different buildings, for questioning. Women and children were raped and beaten. After it was confirmed that they had aided British commandos, Major Ichikawa Seigi ordered the entire village to be massacred. The inhabitants were taken in groups of four to ten people to nearby wells, blindfolded, and bayoneted, and their bodies were dumped in the wells. The village was then burned to the ground. An estimated 600 to 1,000 villagers died in the massacre.

The Japanese kidnapped 10 female survivors who agreed to act as "spies", albeit it is believed that they were instead used as comfort women. Two of them escaped, but the others disappeared.

Prosecutions 
Because the Japanese had conducted the massacre rather hastily, multiple villagers survived the massacre. The survivors became witnesses in war crimes proceedings against some of the participants in the massacre.

In 1946, a British military court tried Seigi and 13 other soldiers for participating in the massacre. Each of them were tried on two counts:

 Participating in the massacre of the villagers
 Participating in the beating, torture, wounding, and other maltreatment of the villagers

Seigi also faced a third charge for kidnapping the women. Ten of them were found guilty. Seven of them were found guilty on both counts, and three others were only found guilty on the second count. Seigi was found guilty on all counts.

Seigi and three officers who supervised the massacre were sentenced to death. The court said Seigi would be hanged, while the other three men would be shot by firing squads.

As for the other three soldiers who were deemed complicit in the massacre. However, the court found that these men either had lesser roles, or that not enough evidence had been found that death sentences were warranted. Each of them were instead given 10-year sentences. The other soldiers were automatically ineligible for execution since they were only found guilty on the second count.

Individual defendants and sentences 

Each of the sentences were confirmed upon review. Seigi and his three condemned codefendants were executed on 15 July 1946, using the methods prescribed by the court. The others were sent to the local jail in Rangoon to serve out their sentences. In mid-1951, those still in prison were transferred to Sugamo Prison in Japan to serve out the rest of their time.

General Heitarō Kimura, one of the defendants at the International Military Tribunal for the Far East, was charged multiple counts, including his failure to prevent atrocities, including the Kalagon massacre. He was sentenced to death and executed in 1948.

See also
 List of massacres in Burma (Myanmar)

References

Citations

Sources

 Raymond Lamont-Brown, 1998, Kempeitai: Japan's Dreaded Military Police, Sutton Publishing, Phoenix Mill, England. .
 Christine Sherman, 2001, War Crimes: Japan's World War II Atrocities, Turner Publishing Company. .

External links
 Burma Star Association  The Massacre of Kalagon Village
 IMTFE: Judgement (English Translation)  Chapter VIII: Conventional War Crimes (Atrocities)

Massacres committed by Japan
Massacres in Myanmar
1945 in Japan
1945 in Burma
Mass murder in 1945
Massacres in 1945
British Empire in World War II
July 1945 events in Asia
World War II massacres
1945 murders in Myanmar